Bure may refer to:

Places

Belgium
Bure, Wallonia, Belgium, a small village in the Tellin municipality
Battle of Bure, a World War II battle during the Battle of the Bulge

Eritrea and Ethiopia
Bure (disputed zone), on the border between Eritrea and Ethiopia, claimed by both countries
Bure, Gojjam (woreda), a woreda (district) in the Amhara Region, Ethiopia
Bure (Gojjam), Ethiopia, a town
Bure, Oromia (woreda), a woreda (district) in the Oromia Region, Ethiopia
Bure, Illubabor, a town

France
Bure, Meuse, a commune in the Meuse department in Grand Est, hosting the Meuse/Haute Marne Underground Research Laboratory
Bure, Moselle a village in the French département of Moselle
Buré, a commune in the French département of Orne

Italy
Bure (torrent), a torrent in Tuscany

Sweden
Bure River, a river in Sweden

Switzerland
Bure, Switzerland, a municipality in the Canton of Jura

United Kingdom
River Bure, a river in Norfolk
HM Prison Bure, Scottow, Norfolk

Other uses
Bure (diocese), a titular see of the Roman Catholic Church in Tunisia
Bure (surname)
Bure (cloth)
Bure Equity, a Swedish investment company
Bure (Fiji), the Fijian word for a wood-and-straw hut
Bure language, an Afro-Asiatic language

See also
Brue (disambiguation)
Búri, or Buri, the first god in Norse mythology